Georgi Gennadyevich Mikadze (born 3 October 1983) is a Russian former professional footballer. He also holds Georgian citizenship.

Club career
He made his debut in the Russian Premier League in 2002 for FC Saturn-RenTV Ramenskoye.

Honours
 Russian Cup finalist: 2005.

References

1983 births
Sportspeople from Kutaisi
Living people
Russian footballers
Russia under-21 international footballers
FC Saturn Ramenskoye players
FC Khimki players
FC Baltika Kaliningrad players
FC Zhemchuzhina Sochi players
FC Salyut Belgorod players
Russian Premier League players
FC Mordovia Saransk players
Association football defenders
FC Chernomorets Novorossiysk players